The 2020 WGC-Mexico Championship was a golf tournament played February 20–23 at Club de Golf Chapultepec in Naucalpan, Mexico, just west of Mexico City. It was the 21st time the WGC Championship is played, and the first of the World Golf Championships events to be staged in 2020. The approximate elevation of the course's clubhouse is  	

Patrick Reed won his second WGC Championship (first in Mexico), by a single stroke ahead of Bryson DeChambeau. DeChambeau was leading heading into the final stages, but scored an aggregate one-over-par on the final 4 holes, whereas Reed birdied the 15th, 16th, and 17th. During the final round five players had a share of the lead, with the other main challengers being Justin Thomas, Rory McIlroy, Jon Rahm, Erik van Rooyen.

Course layout
Club de Golf Chapultepec

Source:

Field
The field consisted of players from the top of the Official World Golf Ranking and the money lists/Orders of Merit from the six main professional golf tours. Each player is classified according to the first category in which he qualified, but other categories are shown in parentheses.

1. The top 50 players from the Official World Golf Ranking, as of February 10, 2020
An Byeong-hun (2), Abraham Ancer (2,3), Rafa Cabrera-Bello (2), Paul Casey (2,3), Bryson DeChambeau (2,3), Matt Fitzpatrick (2,5,6), Tommy Fleetwood (2,3,5,6), Sergio García (2), Tyrrell Hatton (2,5), Billy Horschel (2), Im Sung-jae (2,3,4), Shugo Imahira (2,7), Jazz Janewattananond (2,10), Dustin Johnson (2,3), Kevin Kisner (2,3), Matt Kuchar (2,3), Marc Leishman (2,3,4), Shane Lowry (2,5), Hideki Matsuyama (2,3,4), Graeme McDowell (2,6), Rory McIlroy (2,3,4,5), Francesco Molinari (2), Kevin Na (2), Louis Oosthuizen (2,3,5,6), Victor Perez (2,5,6), Jon Rahm (2,3,5), Chez Reavie (2,3), Patrick Reed (2,3), Xander Schauffele (2,3), Adam Scott (2,3), Webb Simpson (2,3,4), Cameron Smith (2,4), Brandt Snedeker (2,3), Jordan Spieth, Justin Thomas (2,3,4), Erik van Rooyen (5), Matt Wallace (2,5), Bubba Watson (2), Lee Westwood (2,6), Bernd Wiesberger (2,5), Danny Willett (2,5,6), Gary Woodland (2,3)
Patrick Cantlay (2,3), Jason Day (2), Tony Finau (2,3), Rickie Fowler (2,3), Brooks Koepka (2), Justin Rose (2,3), Henrik Stenson (2), and Tiger Woods (2) did not play.

2. The top 50 players from the Official World Golf Ranking, as of February 17, 2020
Christiaan Bezuidenhout (5,6), Collin Morikawa

3. The top 30 players from the final 2019 FedExCup Points List
Corey Conners, Lucas Glover, Charles Howell III, Jason Kokrak

4. The top 10 players from the 2020 FedExCup Points List, as of February 17, 2020
Lanto Griffin, Sebastián Muñoz, Brendon Todd

5. The top 20 players from the final 2019 European Tour Race to Dubai
Jorge Campillo, Benjamin Hébert, Marcus Kinhult, Kurt Kitayama, Mike Lorenzo-Vera, Robert MacIntyre, Matthias Schwab

6. The top 10 players from the 2020 European Tour Race to Dubai, as of February 10, 2020
Branden Grace, Lucas Herbert, Pablo Larrazábal

7. The top 2 players, not otherwise exempt, from the final 2019 Japan Golf Tour Order of Merit
Ryo Ishikawa, Shaun Norris

8. The top 2 players, not otherwise exempt, from the final 2019 PGA Tour of Australasia Order of Merit
Ryan Fox, Zach Murray

9. The top 2 players, not otherwise exempt, from the final 2018–19 Sunshine Tour Order of Merit
Justin Harding, Zander Lombard

10. The top 2 players, not otherwise exempt, from the final 2019 Asian Tour Order of Merit
Scott Hend, Lee Tae-hee

11. The highest-ranked player from Mexico, not otherwise eligible, within the top 300 of the Official World Golf Ranking as of February 10, 2020
Carlos Ortiz

12. Alternates to fill field to 72 (if necessary) from the Official World Golf Ranking as of February 17, 2020
Scottie Scheffler (51)
Kang Sung-hoon (54)

Round summaries

First round
Thursday, February 20, 2020

For the second year running, world number one Rory McIlroy led the tournament after the first round, after shooting a 6-under-par 65 to take a two-shot lead over Justin Thomas and Bubba Watson. McIlroy had an eagle on the 11th hole (his second hole) and had five birdies in his round. No players completed a bogey-free round, with the field shooting a combined 100-over par and a scoring average of 72.389, the highest of any WCG round at Chapultepec.

Second round
Friday, February 21, 2020

The average score was more than 2 stokes lower on day two, than on day one. An 8-under 63 gave Bryson DeChambeau solo lead after making 31 of 32 putts inside 15 feet through two rounds, which also meant he had a career high of total putting distance of 265' 10". On his 30th birthday, Erik van Rooyen was the only player to shoot a bogey-free round, and matched Justin Thomas' course record with a 9-under 62. Rory McIlroy struggled compared to his first round, but three late birdies meant he stayed within 3 strokes of the lead going into day three.

Third round
Saturday, February 22, 2020

Having already won twice in the current PGA Tour season, Justin Thomas shot a 6-under 65 to lead by one stroke after 54-holes, a feat he also achieved at the 2017 WGC-Mexico Championship. Overnight leader Bryson DeChambeau could only hit a level par 71, despite being 3-under after the first two holes, and finished 4 strokes behind Thomas. Jon Rahm set a new tournament and course record after scoring a 10-under 61 which included nine birdies and a hole-in-one on the 17th to finish the day level with DeChambeau.

Final round
Sunday, February 23, 2020

Final leaderboard

Source:

Scorecard
Final round

Cumulative tournament scores, relative to par

Source:

References

External links

Coverage on the European Tour's official site
Media Guide

WGC Championship
Golf tournaments in Mexico
Sport in the State of Mexico
Naucalpan de Juárez
WGC-Mexico Championship
WGC-Mexico Championship
WGC-Mexico Championship